Felicity Wishes is a British children's book series created, written, illustrated and privately owned by the Character Brand Creator Emma Thomson. Books include over 140 story books, activity books, picture books and annuals. The popularity of the books led to the launch of a Felicity Wishes magazine  and hundreds of other products.

The series is about a fairy called Felicity Wishes and her friends Holly, Polly and Daisy and later on Winnie. Felicity lives in a fictional town called Little Blossoming. Little Blossoming, Bloomfield is in Fairy World. Fairy World is much the same as the human world with several key exceptions: there is no age, birth or death (fairies live forever), no men, no meat-eating, no money, no evil and no crime.  Most of the books are set pre-graduation where Felicity goes to the School of Nine Wishes to learn and she eats cake and drinks tea with her friends at Sparkles Cafe. She has also travelled all over Fairy World. In these books Felicity Wishes and her friends both have a single pair of wings, because they still go to school; fairies who have graduated get double wings. Felicity has a constant companion, a little blue bird called Bertie Dishes, the only male character in the whole book series.

Characters
Felicity is the main character of the books. She is a fairy who befriends many people wherever she goes. She is blonde and her favourite colour is pink. She always wears a lot of pink and her signature is her pink and white stripy tights.  In Spooky Sleepover, the 13th book, it is seen that Felicity lacks the ability to cook and can get very clumsy. Felicity wants to be a Friendship Fairy when she graduates.
Holly is one of Felicity's friends. She loves fashion and hairstyles and, lacking a natural talent, has to learn many things. In Party Pickle, the 10th book, it is revealed that Holly's favourite colour is red. Her hair is long, straight and chestnut brown. Holly wants to be a Christmas Fairy when she is older. Holly is quite dramatic and can sometimes be a bit of a show-off. Also, she loves to eat cakes with her friends!
Polly is Felicity's friend. She is very intelligent and is good at almost anything, but she is never self-satisfied. Polly is the smartest of Felicity's friends; she pays more attention to teachers and gets all of her work answers correct. Polly loves teeth, so she wants to be a Tooth Fairy when she is older. Polly is very modest, helpful and kind and has frizzy hair.
Daisy is another one of Felicity's friends. Daisy has a floral interest and does not like going out on sunny days much because she wants to water her flowers. Daisy loves garden centres so she can see flowers.  Daisy daydreams quite a lot, even at school. In one of the magazines, it said that Daisy's favourite colour is green. When Daisy graduates with double wings, she would like to be a Blossom Fairy. Daisy is helpful and kind and seems to be quite shy.
Winnie was released in 2008. She wants to become an Adventure Fairy. Winnie is multiracial, and is very adventurous, brave and curious about the world. She has been all over the Fairy World.

The magazine
The first issue of the magazine was released in 2007; it was the first of 56 issues, released fortnightly. In each magazine Felicity considered a different career: in the first issue, that of a cake-maker. An exclusive Felicity doll with wool hair was included with the first issue and costumes for the doll were given in other issues. Issue 2 had a satin pink bag with the Felicity Wishes logo and the third issue had a box for storing magazines or books. Subsequent editions featured careers that included:  'Journalist', 'Flight Attendant', 'Architect', 'Doctor', 'Decorator', 'Inventor' and 'Chef'

Foreign editions
Felicity Wishes has been translated into over 22 different languages including Portuguese and published by Dinalivro, a Portuguese Publishing House. In Portugal, Felicity has been named «Fada Carolina» («Fada» meaning «fairy» in Portuguese). Little Blossoming became «Cidade das Flores» and the school is called «Escola dos Nove Desejos». More than 20 titles are available in Portugal, most of them reaching their 2nd and 3rd editions.
Some of Felicity's 22 foreign names are Rose Felicity (French), Valeria Varita (Spanish), Dolca Picarol (Catalan), A fada Carolina (Portuguese), Isa Belletje (Dutch), Sofie Fehar (Danish), Felicity Bell (Italian), Tunderi Lonka (Hungarian), Ευτυχία Επιθυμία (Greek) and Felicity Wunschfee (German).

Feminist critiques 

In 2007, writing in the UK newspaper The Independent, Katy Guest raised concerns about the message conveyed to young girls by the line of products associated with the Felicity character: 
 A current advert for a new magazine from the fairy princess Felicity Wishes encourages little girls to dream about their future lives. "Every issue I try out a new job, from cake-maker to nurse, to popstar!" Felicity squeals. "Part 1 comes with a cute Felicity Wishes doll and with every issue, there's a sparkly new outfit to dress her in!" Felicity does not come with an astronaut's costume or a train driver's hat and seems to want little girls to grow up to be homemakers and pop tarts and use too many exclamation marks.

The blog The Alpha Parent iterated similar concerns in a 2012 post analyzing the magazine's series of "dream jobs": "The magazine is an example of how girls are socialised to be *prepared* to accept their place in the sexual division of labour. That is, to aspire to jobs which are less-skilled, lower-paid, and often part-time." Emma Thomson helped admonish the misrepresentation this feature expressed by posting a response that drew attention to the article's many omissions: those Felicity Wishes magazines that featured skilled, higher paid and full-time employment.

References

External links
 Felicity Wishes Official Website.
 Video: Emma Thomson talks about Felicity Wishes

Series of children's books
British children's books
Novels about fairies and sprites